Stefan Aleksander Potocki (? — 1726/1727), the Polish nobleman, Voievoda of Belz, with his second wife Joanna Sieniawska, founders of Basilian monastery in Buchach (UGCC) in Lublin, on December 7, 1712. Owner of the Buchach castle.

Father — Jan Potocki, mother — Teresa Cetner, daughter of Halych castellan.

His body was buried in Pidkamin' monastery (now UGCC).

Son — Mikołaj Bazyli Potocki, Starost of Bohuslav and Kaniv, benefactor of the Buchach townhall, Pochayiv Lavra, Dominican Church (Lviv),  deputy to Sejm, owner of the Buchach castle.

References

Sources
 Sadok Barącz. Pamiątki buczackie. — Lwów: Drukarnia «Gazety narodowej», 1882. — 168 s. 
 Link-Lenczowski A. Potocki Stefan h. Piława (zm. 1726) // Polski Słownik Biograficzny. — Wrocław — Warszawa — Kraków — Gdańsk — Łódź: Zakład Narodowy Imienia Ossolińskich, Wydawnictwo Polskiej Akademii Nauk, 1985. — Tom XXVIII/2. — Zeszyt 117. — 177–368 s. — S. 177–180. 

Stefan Aleksander Potocki
Voievodes of Belz
People from Buchach
1720s deaths